The women's 5,000 m points race in inline speed skating at the 2001 World Games took place on 25 August 2001 at the Akita Prefectural Skating Rink in Akita, Japan.

Competition format
A total of 16 athletes entered the competition. The best six athletes from each of preliminary heats qualifies to the final. Athlete with the most points is a winner.

Results

Preliminary

Heat A

Heat B

Final

References

External links
 Results on IWGA website

Inline speed skating at the 2001 World Games